Iris relicta is a plant species in the genus Iris, it is also in the subgenus Iris. It is a rare rhizomatous perennial, from the mountains of Italy. It is medium-sized, with purple flowers and white beards. It is rarely cultivated as an ornamental plant in temperate regions. It has had a confusing history, once thought as a variety of Iris germanica, then as a separate species with a name shared with another bearded iris. It has only been sorted out since 1996.

Description
It is similar in form to Iris germanica.

It has a branched stem.

Like other irises, it has 2 pairs of petals, 3 large sepals (outer petals), known as the 'falls' and 3 inner, smaller petals (or tepals), known as the 'standards'.
The flowers come in shades of purple, from red-purple,
to blue-purple. In the centre of the falls is a 'beard', or line of white hairs.

After the iris has flowered, it produces a seed capsule, that has not been described.

Biochemistry
As most irises are diploid, having two sets of chromosomes, this can be used to identify hybrids and classification of groupings.
It has a chromosome count of 2n=40.
It was counted by Colasante & Sauer in 1993 and by Colasante in 1996.

It is the same as Iris setina, Iris bicapitata, Iris lutescens and Iris revoluta.

Taxonomy
The Latin specific epithet relicta refers to a remnant, primitive, left behind and relict. This name was chosen due to the diminishing size of the population of irises found on the mountains in Italy.

It was first published and described by Nicola Terracciano (1837–1921) as Iris germanica var. suaveolens in 'Atti dell' Accademia delle Scienze Fisiche e' Matematiche (Atti Accad. Sci. Fis.) series 4, (Appendix 2) on page 7 in 1890, as a variety of Iris germanica. 
It was then published as Iris suaveolens by (N. Terracc.) N. Terracc. ex A. Terracc in 'Nuovo Giorn. Bot. Ital.', series. 2, on page182 in 1894.
But this name was rejected by other authors and iris authorities as it was already used by another iris species, since 1853.

Later it was re-classified as a separate species by Prof. Maretta Colasante in Giornale Botanico Italiano ('Giorn. Bot. Ital.') Vol.123 Supplement 1 on page 112 in 1989, and then called Iris relicta by Colasante in (Fl. Medit.) Vol.6 page 214 in 1996. Based on specimens found on 'Monte delle Fate' in Lazio, Italy.

It was verified by United States Department of Agriculture and the Agricultural Research Service on 7 April 2003, and the updated on 3 December 2004.

It is listed in the Encyclopedia of Life, and in the Catalogue of Life, it is listed as Iris relicta and notes that Iris germanica var. suaveolens	is a synonym.

Distribution and habitat
It is native to Europe.

Range
It is found in Italy, within the central and southern regions. It is found in the region of Lazio on 'Monte della Fate', within the Ausoni Mountains. and near Lago di Fondi.

It is listed as endemic of Italy, with Iris bicapitata, 'Iris italica var. cengialti' (a synonym of Iris pallida subsp. cengialti), Iris marsica, Iris revoluta, Iris sabina and Iris setina.

Habitat
It grows on the rocky mountain-sides with other small shrubs.

Synecology
Part of the Ausoni Mountains are protected by Wilderness Area, (covering 4,230 hectares and was established in 1999), forests (made of oak, cork oak and maple), cover most of the mountain valleys. Under the forest trees are rare and endemic flora, including Crocus imperati subsp imperati, Narcissus poeticus, Asphodeline lutea (Asfodelina), Daphne oleoides (spatula Daphne) and Iris relicta.

Conservation
It is listed as 'very rare', and is protected in the 'Wilderness Area' in Italy.

Cultivation
It is hardy to USDA Zone 7, tolerating dry Mediterranean-like summers.

Propagation
Irises can generally be propagated by division, or by seed growing.

Toxicity
Like many other irises, most parts of the plant are poisonous (rhizome and leaves), and if mistakenly ingested can cause stomach pains and vomiting. Handling the plant may cause skin irritation or an allergic reaction.

References

External links

 Images of the iris flowers from Lazio
 
 Image of a violet flower

relicta
Plants described in 1989
Garden plants
Flora of Europe
Flora of Italy